Mélanie Doutey is a French actress.

Life and career
She is the daughter of filmmaker Alain Doutey and actress Arielle Séménoff. She appeared in Claude Chabrol's La Fleur du Mal and El Lobo, the true story of a mole within the Basque separatist group ETA. She also made a cameo in singer Calogero's video for En Apesanteur.

In 2006, she was nominated for a César Award for Most Promising Actress for her performance in Il ne faut jurer de rien!, a cinematographic adaptation of an Alfred de Musset play.

Her scene with Jean Dujardin and Gilles Lellouche, directed by Jan Kounen was cut from the final version of The Players (2012), but later appeared on some DVD versions.

From 2002 to 2013, Doutey was in a relationship with actor Gilles Lellouche. They have a daughter named Ava, born on 5 September 2009.

, she was dating chef Cyril Lignac.

Filmography

 Leïla (2001), Leïla
 Le frère du guerrier (2002), Guillemette
 La fleur du mal (2003), Michèle Charpin-Vasseur
 Narco (2004), La fille "moitié des choses"
 El Lobo (2004), Amaia
 Il ne faut jurer... de rien! (2005), Cécile
 Clara Sheller,  Clara Sheller (6 episodes, 2005)
 Président (2006), Nahema
 Fair Play (2006),  Béatrice
 On va s'aimer (2006), Camille
 Ce soir, je dors chez toi (2007),  Laeticia
 Ma place au soleil (2007), Véronique
 Santa Closed (2007),  Fille 2
 RTT (2008), Emilie Vergano
 Le bal des actrices (2009), Mélanie Doutey
 Une petite zone de turbulences (2009), Cathie Muret
 Aux yeux de tous (2012), Nora
 Jamais le premier soir (2014), Louise
 La French (2014), Christiane Zampa
 Entre amis (2015), Daphnée
 Paradise Beach (2019), Julia
 Inexorable (2021)

References

External links

  (archived, defunct since late 2020)
 

French film actresses
Living people
French television actresses
21st-century French actresses
Actresses from Paris
French National Academy of Dramatic Arts alumni
French stage actresses
20th-century French actresses
Year of birth missing (living people)